Stigmella styracicolella is a moth of the family Nepticulidae. It is found on Rhodes and in the Near East.

The larvae feed on Styrax officinalis. They mine the leaves of their host plant. The mine consists of a corridor with a central frass line. Pupation takes place outside of the mine.

External links
Fauna Europaea
bladmineerders.nl

Nepticulidae
Moths of Europe
Moths of Asia
Moths described in 1978